Mỹ Hào is a district-level town (thị xã) of Hưng Yên province in the Red River Delta region of Vietnam. As of 2019 the town had a population of 158,673. The district covers an area of 79 km². The district capital lies at Bần Yên Nhân.

References

Districts of Hưng Yên province
County-level towns in Vietnam